Campanula parryi, or Parry's bellflower, is a plant.

Uses
It is used medicinally by the Zuni people. The blossoms are chewed, and the saliva is applied to the skin as a depilatory. A poultice of chewed root is also applied to bruises.

References

parryi
Flora of the Western United States
Plants used in traditional Native American medicine
Plants described in 1886
Flora without expected TNC conservation status